Barapada Engineering School (BES), came into being in 1957. Late Dr Harekrushna Mahatab, the then Chief Minister of Odisha conceived the idea with the objective of developing it in due course to a rural university.

Initially the school was organized and managed by a citizen of Bhadrak, the late Narendra Prasad Das. However, in the middle 1960s, it was closed down. It restarted in 1982 as Barapda School of Engineering & Technology (BSET) at the same site. This was possible due to the leadership of late Chintamani Mohanty, a leading advocate of Bhadrak who acted as the President of the governing body. Its growth was further advanced when Sri Jugal Kishore Pattnaik, the then Minister of Odisha obtained help for its improvement.

In the meantime, the governing body was reconstituted with Sri Debendra Mohapatra as its president. The institution embarked upon a new phase of development when the governing body was reconstituted in July 1990, with Sj. Prafulla Samal, the then Minister of State of Labour & Employment, as its president.

Bhadrak Institute of Engineering & Technology (BIET) in Odisha, India, was established in 1982. The Degree Engineering Courses started in 1997, M.C.A. Courses in 1998, MBA. courses in 2002 and the ITI courses in 2000.

BIET is a life member of the  Indian Society for Technical Education (ISTE). There is an ISTE student chapter, which conducts seminars and workshops.

College is spread over 10.33 Acres area.

Affiliation
The institution offers B.Tech, MCA and MBA courses. These are approved by All India Council for Technical Education (AICTE), New Delhi, recognized by the government of Odisha and affiliated to Biju Pattnaik University of Technology (BPUT), Rourkela.

Facilities

Hostel 
There are four hostels: East, West, and North for boys, and Titanic for girls.

Library 
The institute has a library-cum-reading room located in the main academic block that caters to the need of teachers and students. It has 33,000 volumes of text and reference books. The library subscribes to 115 journals and periodicals, multimedia, CDs by IITians, study materials of NPTEL /MIT and e-journals (IEEE/IEE, ASME).

Transport 
BIET has a fleet of vehicles to cater to the transportation needs of its students, staff members and visiting guests. These buses serve as the link between the campus and the city.

Health Care 
A PHC situated adjacent to the college campus meets any health related casualty. Two ambulances provide a 24-hour service. A pharmacist has been appointed with a first-Aid centre to help the students.

Bank

United Bank Of India & Punjab National bank wings are available

Location 
The institute is located at Barapada, about 8 km away from Bhadrak and 140 km away from Bhubaneswar.

Departments
Degree, MCA and MBA courses are approved by the All India Council for Technical Education (AICTE), New Delhi, recognized by Government of Odisha and affiliated to Biju Patnaik University of Technology (BPUT), Rourkela. The Diploma courses are affiliated to the State Council for Technical Education & Vocational Training (SCTE & VT), Odisha.

The institute offers B.Tech. (Bachelor of Technology) 4 years programme in the following disciplines:
 Civil Engineering
 Computer Science and Engineering
 Electronics and Communication Engineering
 Information Technology
 Mechanical Engineering
 Electrical Engineering
Diploma 3-year programme in the following disciplines:
 Civil Engineering (CE)
 Computer Science and Engineering (CS)
 Electronics and Communication Engineering (ETC)
 Information Technology (IT)
 Mechanical Engineering (ME)
 Electrical Engineering (EE)

M.Tech 2-year programme in the following disciplines:
 Mechanical Engineering (ME)
 Electrical Engineering (EE)

Other departments
 Department of Mathematics & Humanities
 Department of Chemistry
 Department of Physics
 Department of MCA
 Department of Business Administration

References

External links
 Official website of BIET

All India Council for Technical Education
Engineering colleges in Odisha
Business schools in Odisha
Colleges affiliated with Biju Patnaik University of Technology
Bhadrak district
Educational institutions established in 1982
1982 establishments in Orissa